The Very Reverend Sir Monti Rock III (born Joseph Montanez, Jr. May 29, 1942 in The Bronx, New York City) is an American musician and performer.

Life and career
Born on 29 May 1942 to a Puerto Rican family in the Bronx, Rock parlayed his role as celebrity hairdresser into a role center stage.  After several appearances and performances on The Merv Griffin Show beginning in 1966, Rock's wild antics, which included throwing bananas into the audience, and outrageous personality brought him to the national stage when he began appearing regularly as a guest on The Tonight Show.

Rock is generally considered to be one of the first disco artists to cross into the mainstream.  In February 1975, Rock released Disco-Tex & His Sex-O-Lettes Review, an LP of disco songs and collaboration with producer Bob Crewe and featuring musician Jerry Corbetta of Sugarloaf.  Two of the album's tracks, "Get Dancin'" and "I Wanna Dance Wit' Choo (Doo Dat Dance)", became hit singles in the United States and instant staples at burgeoning New York dance clubs including Studio 54. The two songs were also Top 10 hits in the United Kingdom. By the end of the 1970s, disco music was fully mainstream, and Rock appeared in the movie Saturday Night Fever as the DJ.

After reinventing himself several times as "Monti Rock II", "Monti Rock IV", "Monti Rock V", and "Sir Monti Rock", Rock settled on just "Monti Rock".  He currently resides and performs in Las Vegas.

Monti is now an ordained minister, according to his Facebook page.

References

American performance artists
1942 births
Living people